Half Angel is a 1936 American comedy film directed by Sidney Lanfield and written by Gene Fowler, Bess Meredyth and Allen Rivkin. The film stars Frances Dee, Brian Donlevy, Charles Butterworth, Helen Westley, Henry Stephenson and Sara Haden. The film was released on May 22, 1936, by 20th Century Fox.

Plot

Cast  
Frances Dee as Allison Lang
Brian Donlevy as Duffy Giles
Charles Butterworth as Doc Felix
Helen Westley as Martha Hargraves
Henry Stephenson as Prof. Jerome Hargraves
Sara Haden as Henrietta Hargraves
Etienne Girardot as Dr. Alexander Cotton
Paul Stanton as District Attorney
Gavin Muir as Dr. William Barth
Julius Tannen as City Editor
Nigel De Brulier as Dr. Hall
Hilda Vaughn as Bertha
Philip Sleeman as Carl
William Ingersoll as Judge
Paul McVey as Coroner
Bruce Mitchell as Police Sergeant

References

External links 
 

1936 films
1930s English-language films
American comedy films
1936 comedy films
20th Century Fox films
Films directed by Sidney Lanfield
American black-and-white films
1930s American films